Wingfield Academy is a coeducational secondary school with academy status, located in the Wingfield area of Rotherham, South Yorkshire, England. It has been renamed three times since it opened. It was originally named Wingfield Comprehensive School until September 2006 when it became simply Wingfield School. In September 2008, it became a specialist school and was rebranded as Wingfield Business & Enterprise College. The third rename occurred in August 2013 when the college completed its transition to an academy becoming Wingfield Academy. On 1 December 2020 Wingfield Academy become part of the New Collaborative Learning Trust.

Ofsted inspections
Since the commencement of Ofsted inspections in September 1993, the school has undergone 10 inspections:

References

External links 
 Wingfield Academy website

Secondary schools in Rotherham
Academies in Rotherham